Christine van Meeteren (26 April 1885 – 3 January 1973) was a Dutch film actress of the silent era. She appeared in 17 films between 1913 and 1936.

Filmography
 Komedie om geld (1936)
 Majoor Frans (1916)
 Het geheim van den vuurtoren (1916)
 Liefdesstrijd (1915)
 De vrouw Clasina (1915)
 De vloek van het testament (1915)
 Toffe jongens onder de mobilisatie (1914)
 Weergevonden (1914)
 De bloemen, die de ziel vertroosten (1914)
 Liefde waakt (1914)
 Een telegram uit Mexico (1914)
 De zigeunerin (1914)
 Zijn viool (1914)
 Krates (1913)
 Silvia Silombra (1913)
 Nederland en Oranje (1913)
 Mijntje en Trijntje (1913)

References

External links

1885 births
1973 deaths
Dutch film actresses
Dutch silent film actresses
Actresses from Amsterdam
20th-century Dutch actresses